Victor Petroni is a retired Canadian soccer goalkeeper who played professionally in the Major Indoor Soccer League and American Indoor Soccer Association.

Player
In 1980, Petroni signed with the Buffalo Stallions of the Major Indoor Soccer League. In the summer of 1980 he played in the National Soccer League with the Buffalo Blazers. In 1981, he moved to the Kansas City Comets.  He played two seasons with Kansas City before joining the Phoenix Pride.  The Pride folded at the end of the season and Petroni had trials with several MISL teams before signing with the Kalamazoo Kangaroos of the American Indoor Soccer Association.  He was the 1986 AISA Goalkeeper of the Year with the Kangaroos.  In the fall of 1986, he moved to the Louisville Thunder.

Coach
Since retiring he had become Director of Coaching at the Athletic Flames Football Club in Kentucky.  In February 1993, the University of Louisville hired Petroni to coach the men's soccer team.  He coached the team for three seasons, compiling a 14-41-3 record.

Petroni currently is the director of goalkeeping for the Javanon FC in Louisville, Kentucky and has coached several teams at Javanon, including 2001 Boys Black.

Referee
He is also a referee and refereeing assessor.

Yearly Awards
 AISA Goalkeeper of the Year 1985 - 1986
 AISA All-Star Team 1985 - 1986

References

External links
 MISL stats

1959 births
Living people
American Indoor Soccer Association players
Buffalo Stallions players
Canadian soccer coaches
Canadian soccer players
Canadian soccer referees
Kalamazoo Kangaroos players
Kansas City Comets (original MISL) players
Louisville Cardinals men's soccer coaches
Louisville Thunder players
Major Indoor Soccer League (1978–1992) players
Phoenix Pride players
Soccer players from Toronto
Association football goalkeepers
Canadian National Soccer League players